Francesco Bertuccioli is an Italian editor. He has worked in Quello strano desiderio (1979), by Enzo Milioni; in gothic films such as L'amante del demonio, by Paolo Lombardo; and Un bianco vestito per Marialé (1972), by Romano Scavolini; and in crime films such as La belva col mitra (1977) along Adalberto Ceccarelli and Armando Bertuccioli.

Filmography

References

Bibliography

External links
 

Italian film editors
Italian film producers
Year of birth missing (living people)
Living people